is a 1927 black-and-white silent Japanese film directed by Jukō Takahashi.

Cast 
 Katsutaro Asami as Monkichi
 Kanji Ishii as Jūshirō Morio
 Miharu Ito as Tsuyuji

References

External links
 
 http://www.jmdb.ne.jp/1927/bc004880.htm
 http://plaza.rakuten.co.jp/roberobe1963/diary/200711080000/
 http://www.silentera.com/PSFL/data/S/SunaeJubaku1927.html

Other 1927 films with similar name (because there may be mistakes in other Internet databases):
 砂絵呪縛 第一篇 by Makino production, directed by Bansho Kanamori, released: 8 September 1927.   
 砂絵呪縛　第三篇 produced by Bando Tsumasaburo Production, directed by Minoru Inuzuka, released: 15 December 1927.  
 砂絵呪縛　第三篇(?) produced by  Tōa Kinema, directed by Shūsei Gotō, released: ? (1927)  

1927 films
Japanese silent films
Japanese black-and-white films